Robert Hyatt Clark (January 28, 1913 – May 13, 1976) was an American athlete who competed mainly in the Decathlon.

He competed for a United States in the 1936 Summer Olympics held in Berlin, Germany in the Decathlon where he won the silver medal.

External links 
 
 

1913 births
1976 deaths
Athletes (track and field) at the 1936 Summer Olympics
American male decathletes
Olympic silver medalists for the United States in track and field
Medalists at the 1936 Summer Olympics